Merle Lawrence (1915 – January 29, 2007) was an American
physiologist who contributed extensively to the field of Otolaryngology.

Biography
Merle Lawrence was born in Remsen, New York in the United States. He received his PhD in 1941 at Princeton University under the supervision of Dr. E. Glen Wever where the work on vertebrate hearing by Dr Wever inspired Dr Lawrence to undertake the research as a lifelong study. The National Research Council offered him a fellowship that led to a postdoctoral post with Dr. Stacy Guild at the Otolaryngology Department at Johns Hopkins University.

Merle served as a Naval aviator of the US Naval reserve during World War II and was deployed to the South Pacific. He contributed to assignments at the School of Aviation Medicine in Pensacola, Florida and at the Bureau of Medicine and Surgery in Washington, D.C. He held a brief position as a trainer of helicopter piloting during the Korean War.

In 1946, Merle became an Assistant Professor at Princeton University and collaborated with Dr Wever in research. He was appointed as an Associate Researcher at the Lempert Institute of Otology in New York City from 1946 to 1952.

Dr Lawrence joined the Otolaryngology Department at the University of Michigan in 1952 invited by Dr. Furstenberg, Chair of the Otolaryngology Department and Dean of the Medical School. He founded the Kresge Hearing Research Institute in 1963. Under his leadership the Institute became one of the largest and most influential centers for research on hearing worldwide. As its first Director until retirement in 1983, Merle conducted research on inner physiology

External links
Merle Lawrence

1915 births
2007 deaths
People from Remsen, New York
Princeton University alumni
University of Michigan faculty
Johns Hopkins University fellows